Norbert George "Nub" Kleinke (May 19, 1911 – March 16, 1950) was an American professional baseball pitcher who appeared in nine games in Major League Baseball for the St. Louis Cardinals during the seasons of 1935 and 1937.

Kleinke had a 14-season (1931–44) pro career, spending 11 years at the top level of minor league baseball. In his two stints with the Cardinals, Kleinke made four starts and threw one complete game, a 9–3 victory over the Brooklyn Dodgers at
Sportsman's Park on September 21, 1937. It was his only MLB triumph. In his nine games, Kleinke posted a 1–1 career won–lost record and a 4.86 earned run average. In 33 innings pitched, he permitted 44 hits and ten bases on balls; he struck out 14. In the minor leagues, he won over 155 games. 

Kleinke died on March 16, 1950, after suffering a heart attack while fishing off the coast of Marin County, California.

References

External links

1911 births
1950 deaths
Baseball players from Wisconsin
Cedar Rapids Bunnies players
Columbus Red Birds players
Elmira Red Wings players
Major League Baseball pitchers
Memphis Chickasaws players
Oakland Oaks (baseball) players
Rochester Red Wings players
Sacramento Solons players
St. Louis Cardinals players
San Diego Padres (minor league) players
Sportspeople from Fond du Lac, Wisconsin